James Willard Ramsdell  (April 4, 1916 – October 8, 1969) was a pitcher in Major League Baseball. Born in Williamsburg, Kansas, he pitched from 1947 to 1952 for the Brooklyn Dodgers, Cincinnati Reds and Chicago Cubs.

Ramsdell died on October 8, 1969 after a long illness.

References

External links

Retrosheet
Venezuelan Professional Baseball League statistics

1916 births
1969 deaths
Baseball players from Kansas
Beaumont Exporters players
Big Spring Barons players
Brooklyn Dodgers players
Chicago Cubs players
Cincinnati Reds players
Colorado Springs Sky Sox (WL) players
Fort Worth Cats players
Hollywood Stars players
Iola Indians players
Leones del Caracas players
Major League Baseball pitchers
Mobile Bears players
Muskogee Reds players
Navegantes del Magallanes players
American expatriate baseball players in Venezuela
Odessa Oilers players
People from Franklin County, Kansas
Portland Beavers players
Santa Barbara Saints players